The WTA Doubles Championships is a defunct WTA Tour affiliated tennis tournament for doubles, played from 1975 to 1997. It was held on indoor carpet courts from 1975 to 1981 and from 1983 to 1990, and on outdoor clay courts in 1982 and from 1991 to 1997.

Results

References
 WTA Results Archive

 
Carpet court tennis tournaments
Indoor tennis tournaments
Clay court tennis tournaments
Tennis tournaments in Japan
Tennis tournaments in the United States
Tennis tournaments in Scotland

Defunct tennis tournaments